Rodney Harding (born August 1, 1962) was a defensive lineman in the Canadian Football League.

Harding played college football at Oklahoma State University. He had a 12-year career in the Canadian Football League from 1985 to 1996, and he played mainly with the Toronto Argonauts, but ended his career with seasons at the Memphis Mad Dogs and Calgary Stampeders.  He was a CFL All-Star two times. He was a part of the Argonauts 1991 Grey Cup winning team.

In 2016, he was inducted into the Canadian Football Hall of Fame.

References

1962 births
Living people
American players of Canadian football
Calgary Stampeders players
Canadian football defensive linemen
Canadian Football Hall of Fame inductees
Memphis Mad Dogs players
Oklahoma State Cowboys football players
Sportspeople from Oklahoma City
Toronto Argonauts players